SureType is a QWERTY-based character input method for cell phones which is used on the BlackBerry Pearl. SureType combines a traditional telephone keypad with a QWERTY-based keyboard to create a non-standard way to input text on a cell phone. In addition, SureType contains a list of 35,000 English words, so when a user types the beginning of a word, all the possible words which start with those letters show up on the screen. Additional words can also be added to the word list.

SureType was developed by BlackBerry vendor Research in Motion.

See also
T9 (predictive text), a predictive text input technology for mobile phones

External links 
 Technology home page

Keyboard layouts
BlackBerry